MV Lord of the Isles is one of the larger Caledonian Maritime Assets Limited ferries, run by Caledonian MacBrayne and largely operating from Mallaig on the west of Scotland. Built in Port Glasgow, she is the most-travelled vessel in the CalMac fleet.

History
MV Lord of the Isles, affectionately known as LOTI, was launched on 7 March 1989 at Ferguson Shipbuilders, Port Glasgow. Although based in Oban and Mallaig, she is able to berth and load traffic all over the Clyde and Hebridean Isles network.

Layout
The car deck, open at the stern, is capable of holding up to 56 cars and she has a vehicle hoist to allow loading at the older piers. 

The passenger accommodation provides space for a maximum certificate complement of 506. It consists of lounges, a cafeteria, a bar and a shop on one deck, with an aft observation lounge on the deck above. She is the last vessel in the fleet to have sleeping accommodation for the longer passages.

Service
Entering service in 1989 on the Coll / Tiree and Barra / South Uist routes from Oban, Lord of the Isles combined two previous timetables. This freed up both Columba (1964) and Claymore (1978) and allowed a cascade to take place within the fleet.

During the winter months she returned to Oban in a relief role. From 2003 to 2016, LOTI returned to Oban, alongside Isle of Mull and Clansman, providing additional sailings on a range of routes. With seven islands appearing regularly in her routine, she is easily the most-travelled vessel in today's fleet. She has also served at Wemyss Bay over the May Day holiday weekend in 2004 and on the Ardrossan - Brodick route in 2012, while  went for overhaul.

From 2013, Lord of the Isles ran a trial winter service between Mallaig and Lochboisdale. Over half of the scheduled trial sailings were cancelled due to adverse weather and tidal conditions. Despite the apparent lack of success, it was announced in September 2015 that LOTI would commence daily return sailings on the route from the summer timetable in 2016.

Since the winter of 2016/17, Lord of the Isles started serving Oban from Lochboisdale on Mondays and Fridays, alongside her thrice-weekly sailings to Mallaig. On Mondays, from Oban she makes an afternoon return crossing to Colonsay, before returning to Lochboisdale in the evening.

This arrangement is expected to continue until the new  enters service on the Ardrossan-Brodick crossing in late 2021, partnering .

In April and May 2021, Lord of the Isles combined the Lochboisdale and Castlebay services, while  returned to the Stornoway - Ullapool service, with  undergoing repairs to the port engine.

See also
 Caledonian MacBrayne fleet

References

External links

MV Lord of the Isles on www.calmac.co.uk

Caledonian MacBrayne
1989 ships
Oban
Ships built on the River Clyde